Joseph Kramer or first-name variants thereof may refer to:

Joey Kramer (born 1950), America drummer for the band Aerosmith
Josef Kramer (1906–1945), executed Nazi war criminal
Josef Krämer (1879–1946), German gymnast and athlete
Joseph Kramer (sexologist) (born 1947), American sexologist and filmmaker 
Joseph Kramer, owner of Millersburg Ferry in Pennsylvania in 1866
Joseph Kramer, founder of Kramer Electronics headquartered in Tel Aviv, Israel
Joseph Kramer, interpreter of Taoist sexual practices that underlie Yoni massage

See also
Joey Cramer (born 1973), Canadian actor
Joe Kraemer (born 1964), American professional baseball pitcher
Joe Kraemer (composer) (born 1971), American composer and conductor
Joel Kramer (born 1955), American professional basketball player
Joseph Kramm (1907–1991), American playwright, actor, and director